Rockvale is a statutory town in Fremont County, Colorado, United States. The population was 487 at the 2010 census, up from 426 at the 2000 census.

Geography
Rockvale is located in southeastern Fremont County at  (38.368845, -105.164813). It is bordered to the north by the town of Williamsburg, and the town of Coal Creek is to the east.

Demographics

As of the census of 2000, there were 426 people, 166 households, and 122 families residing in the town. The racial makeup of the town was 94.60% White, 0.23% African American, 0.47% Native American, 0.23% Asian, 1.64% from other races, and 2.82% from two or more races. Hispanic or Latino of any race were 4.23% of the population.

There were 166 households, out of which 27.7% had children under the age of 18 living with them, 57.8% were married couples living together, 12.0% had a female householder with no husband present, and 26.5% were non-families. 22.9% of all households were made up of individuals, and 9.6% had someone living alone who was 65 years of age or older.  The average household size was 2.57 and the average family size was 2.98.

In the town, the population was spread out, with 24.9% under the age of 18, 6.8% from 18 to 24, 28.4% from 25 to 44, 28.2% from 45 to 64, and 11.7% who were 65 years of age or older.  The median age was 39 years. For every 100 females, there were 96.3 males.  For every 100 females age 18 and over, there were 92.8 males.

The median income for a household in the town was $30,000, and the median income for a family was $33,182. Males had a median income of $28,182 versus $17,679 for females. The per capita income for the town was $13,965.  About 13.1% of families and 17.8% of the population were below the poverty line, including 27.1% of those under age 18 and 17.0% of those age 65 or over.

See also

 List of municipalities in Colorado

References

External links

 Town of Rockvale contacts
 CDOT map of the Town of Rockvale

Towns in Fremont County, Colorado
Towns in Colorado